Pigs + Battleships is the only studio album released by the British, Manchester-based new wave and dance project Quando Quango. It was produced by American producer Mark Kamins at Strawberry Studios, Stockport with mixing taking place at Shakedown Studio, New York, USA and Genetik Studio, England. The artwork was designed by Alan David-Tu with photography by Kevin Cummins. Pigs + Battleships includes the majority of the group's studio output and features the singles "Go Exciting", "Genius", and on UK Cassette and US editions "Love Tempo" is also included.

The album was released on LP and Cassette in November 1985 by Factory Records and peaked at number seventeen on the UK Indie Chart. US editions include "Love Tempo (Remix)" instead of "Low Rider".

The album has since been re-issued on CD twice with differing bonus tracks. The 2003 CD reissue by LTM Recordings includes singles, remixes and b-sides. The 2013 CD reissue by Factory Benelux include a BBC session, a mix of "Genius" and the retains the mix of "Love Tempo" that appears on UK Cassette and US editions of the album.

The album was named after the 1961 film , directed by Shohei Imamura.

Track listing

Personnel
Mike Pickering - saxophone, vocals
Gonnie Rietveld - keyboards, vocals
Simon Topping - percussion, vocals
Barry Johnson - bass, rhythm guitar
Beverly McDonald - vocals
The A Team - trombone, trumpet
Andy Connell - keyboards
Vini Reilly - guitar
Derek Johnson - toaster
Johnny Marr - guitar ("Atom Rock (Remix)", "Triangle")

Production
Mark Kamins - producer, remix ("Love Tempo (Remix)", "Atom Rock (Remix)")
Bernard Sumner - producer ("Love Tempo (Remix)", "Atom Rock (Remix)", "Triangle")
Donald Johnson - producer ("Tingle", "Go Exciting (Original Mix)"), co-producer ("Love Tempo (Remix)", "Atom Rock (Remix)", "Triangle")
Tim Oliver - engineer
Alan Meyerson - mix
Paul "Groucho" Smylik - mix ("This Feeling")
Ivan Ivan - ace snip job ("Genius")
Kevin Cummins - group photography
Alan David-Tu - sleeve

Technical
Recorded at Strawberry Studios, Stockport, England, December 1984
Mixed at Shakedown Studio New York, USA February 1985
"This Feeling" mixed at Genetik Studio, England
Publisher Island Music Ltd.
Tracks 10 to 13 on 2013 CD reissue are a BBC radio session recorded for David 'Kid' Jensen on 8 March 1984.

References

Quando Quango albums
1985 debut albums
Factory Records albums